Ousmane Coulibaly (born 9 July 1989) is a Malian professional footballer who plays as a right back. His brother is the professional kickboxer, multiple champion of France and world champion, Abdarhmane Coulibaly.

Career
In August 2014, Coulibaly signed a three year-contract with Superleague side Platanias for an undisclosed fee. He played exceptionally well for two consecutive years, therefore was monitored by several Greek top clubs, as well as German and English clubs.

On 30 August 2016, Coulibaly moved to Panathinaikos for an estimated amount of €250,000 signing a three-season contract with the club. He was expected to be the backup of experienced Italian Giandomenico Mesto. On 11 January 2018, Mechelen filed an offer to the financially struggling Greens for the acquisition of Coulibaly in the range of €200,000. The player asked to be excluded from the first-team squad on 16 April 2018 due to Panathinaikos being in a dire financial and administrative state, and two weeks later, he filed an official request to leave Panathinaikos on a free transfer.

On 8 January 2022, Coulibaly suffered a heart attack in a match against Al Rayyan. He was in a stable condition per a statement from his club.

Career statistics

(* Includes UEFA Champions League and UEFA Europa League)

(** Includes Coupe de la Ligue and Greek Playoffs)

Honours
Mali
Africa Cup of Nations bronze: 2013

Personal life

Health 
On 8 January 2022, in the first half of the Qatar Stars League match between Al-Rayyan and Al-Wakrah, Coulibaly suffered a heart attack and was taken to hospital.

References

External links
 
 

1989 births
Living people
Association football fullbacks
French footballers
French sportspeople of Malian descent
Footballers from Paris
Citizens of Mali through descent
Malian footballers
Mali international footballers
Malian expatriate footballers
Malian expatriate sportspeople in France
Malian expatriate sportspeople in Greece
Malian expatriate sportspeople in Qatar
Expatriate footballers in France
Expatriate footballers in Greece
Expatriate footballers in Qatar
Ligue 1 players
Ligue 2 players
Super League Greece players
Qatar Stars League players
En Avant Guingamp players
Stade Brestois 29 players
FC Mantois 78 players
Platanias F.C. players
Panathinaikos F.C. players
Al-Wakrah SC players
2012 Africa Cup of Nations players
2013 Africa Cup of Nations players
2015 Africa Cup of Nations players
2017 Africa Cup of Nations players
Footballers from Yvelines